Body Alchemy: Transsexual Portraits is a 1996 book collecting photographs and writing of Loren Cameron. It documents the process of transition and everyday lives of the author and other trans men.

The book
Body Alchemy: Transsexual Portraits was met with much praise for its intimate yet respectful portrayal of trans men, and was a double 1996 Lambda Literary Award winner. It remains a milestone on the subject of FTM documentary and a book referred to in other works on transsexualism.

References and footnotes

Photographic collections and books
Transgender non-fiction books
Trans men's culture
1996 non-fiction books
American non-fiction books
Lambda Literary Award-winning works
1990s LGBT literature
LGBT literature in the United States